The Anthracoideaceae are a family of smut fungi in the order Ustilaginales. Collectively, the family contains 20 genera and 198 species. Anthracoideaceae was circumscribed by the Bulgarian mycologist Cvetomir M. Denchev in 1997.

Genera
Anthracoidea
Cintractia
Crotalia
Dermatosorus
Farysia
Farysporium
Heterotolyposporium
Kuntzeomyces
Leucocintractia
Moreaua
Orphanomyces
Pilocintractia
Planetella
Portalia
Schizonella
Stegocintractia
Testicularia
Tolyposporium
Trichocintractia
Ustanciosporium

See also
 List of Basidiomycota families

References

External links

Ustilaginomycotina
Anthracoideaceae